The United States Treaties and Other International Agreements (UST) contains all treaties and international agreements of the United States since 1950. It is published annually from slip treaties of the Treaties and Other International Acts Series (TIAS). The Secretary of State is responsible for its compilation, editing, indexing, and publication.

Treaties and international agreements were formally published in United States Statutes at Large until 1948.

History 

See also 
 List of United States treaties
 Treaties and Other International Acts Series (TIAS)
 Treaty series

External links 

 United States Treaties at the Library of Congress

Collections of treaties
Treaties of the United States
United States Department of State publications